Bashkibash (Başqıbaş) is a rural locality (a selo) in Yalgyz-Naratsky Selsoviet, Tatyshlinsky District, Bashkortostan, Russia. The population was 252 as of 2010. There are 3 streets.

Geography 
Bashkibash is located 35 km southwest of Verkhniye Tatyshly (the district's administrative centre) by road. Yalgyz-Narat is the nearest rural locality.

References 

Rural localities in Tatyshlinsky District